In My Father's Den is a 2004 New Zealand film written and directed by Brad McGann and starring Matthew Macfadyen and Emily Barclay. It is based on the novel of the same title by Maurice Gee. The film was released in October 2004 to glowing reviews.

Plot 
Following the death of his father Jeff (Matthew Chamberlain), renowned war photographer Paul Prior (Matthew Macfadyen) returns to his hometown in the South Island of New Zealand. Paul also reunites with his younger brother Andrew (Colin Moy), a pious local ostrich farmer, who is married to the very religious Penny (Miranda Otto). Under Andrew's pressure, Paul reluctantly prolongs his stay to help sort out the sale of their father's cottage and the adjoining orchard.

Returning to the dilapidated family property, Paul revisits his father's makeshift den in the equipment shed. Jeff, who secretly harboured a love of wine, literature, and free-thinking philosophy, found solace in the den away from his puritanical wife Iris (Vanessa Riddell). When Paul as a child had accidentally stumbled upon this wondrous booklined universe, his father had shared the den with him on the condition that he did not tell anyone else.

While back in his hometown, Paul accepts a temporary English teaching position at his old high school. Paul also forges an unlikely friendship with the 16-year-old Celia (Emily Barclay), a teenaged misfit who loves writing and dreams of traveling to Spain. Celia is the daughter of Paul's former girlfriend Jackie (Jodie Rimmer), the town's butcher. Believing Celia to be his daughter, Paul becomes a father figure for the teenager. Resenting the unwanted attentions of her mother's boyfriend Gareth (Antony Starr), Celia seeks solace in Paul's den.

Paul and Celia's budding friendship eventually comes under scrutiny from the judgemental Andrew and the envious Jackie. After Paul attacks Gareth for beating Celia, Jackie forbids Paul from having contact with her daughter. Despite the warnings, Celia continues to visit and Paul encourages her in her ambitions as a writer. In the middle of winter, Celia goes missing. Due to their close friendship, Paul becomes the prime suspect in her disappearance and endures the hostility of the town including Gareth and his teenage nephew Jonathan (Jimmy Keen), who fancied Celia.

The rest of the film is shown in flashbacks of Paul's teenage years interspersed with his interactions with Celia and final confrontation with Andrew. After Jonathan reveals that his father had confiscated his camera for illicitly photographing Celia, Paul confronts Andrew. Jeff is revealed to be Celia's biological father through an affair with Jackie. Grief-stricken and betrayed, Paul's mother Iris (Vanessa Riddell) had committed suicide. Despite the pleas of Andrew, Paul had left the family home at the age of 17. Hating his father, Andrew came to blame Paul for their mother's death.

Paul also learns that Andrew had invited Celia to view their late father's will. Jeff had left a third of his estate to Celia. Mistaking Celia for Andrew's mistress after accidentally viewing Jonathan's photos, an enraged Penny had pushed Celia over the balcony, killing her. To protect his wife, Andrew takes the blame for Celia's death. Believing his father killed Celia, Jonathan calls the police who arrest Andrew.

Celia's body is later found in a river. Following the funeral, Paul burns the den and reconciles with Jackie. The film closes with a flashback to the last time Paul saw Celia; they openly talk about being siblings, and they say goodbye as she walks down the road to her untimely death.

Cast 
 Matthew Macfadyen as Paul Prior
 Emily Barclay as Celia
 Colin Moy as Andrew
 Miranda Otto as Penny
 Jodie Rimmer as Jackie
 Vanessa Riddell as Iris
 Matthew Chamberlain as Jeff
 Antony Starr as Gareth
 Jimmy Keen as Jonathan
 Asher Emanuel as Young Paul' Production 
Filming locations were mainly in Central Otago, New Zealand, with the town of Roxburgh standing in for the fictional Rapata Junction. Interior scenes of Andrew and Penny's house were filmed in Auckland.In My Father's Den was the only feature film and the final work written or directed by McGann, who died of bowel cancer in 2007.

Awards
The film won the Fipresci Prize at the 2004 Toronto International Film Festival, the Mercedes Benz Youth Jury Prize at the 52nd San Sebastián International Film Festival in Spain in the same year, the Special Jury Prize at the Seattle International Film Festival in 2005 and the Grand Prix at the 2005 Festival du Film Britannique de Dinard. It became one of the top 10 grossing New Zealand films.

Critical reaction
The website rottentomatoes.com, which compiles mostly North American reviews, gives the film a 100 per cent "fresh" rating, meaning consistently positive reviews, and with an average rating of 7.2 out of 10. The latter figure is the average from seven reviews. The film also garnered acclaim in many publications. A reviewer for The Australian described the film as "one of the best films I have ever seen". Meanwhile, Empire'' described that "director Brad McGann reveals great skill and bravery in the way he brings the story's insular world to life".

References

External links

Sydney Morning Herald movie review
 In My Father's Den at NZ On Screen

2004 films
2004 drama films
Films based on New Zealand novels
New Zealand drama films
2000s English-language films